Langenfeld (Rheinland) station is located in the city of Langenfeld in the German state of North Rhine-Westphalia. It is on the Cologne–Duisburg line and is classified by Deutsche Bahn as a category 5 station.  It is served by Rhine-Ruhr S-Bahn lines S 6 every 20 minutes and by a few services of S 68 (which start or finish in Langenfeld) in the peak hour.

Services 

Currently, the station is served by two S-Bahn lines and seven bus routes.

Notes

Railway stations in Germany opened in 1845
Rhine-Ruhr S-Bahn stations
S6 (Rhine-Ruhr S-Bahn)
S68 (Rhine-Ruhr S-Bahn)
1845 establishments in Prussia
Buildings and structures in Mettmann (district)